Saint Casilda of Toledo (950–1050) is venerated as a saint of the Catholic Church and the Eastern Orthodox Church. Her feast day is April 9th.

Casilda was a Muslim princess, the daughter of the ruler of Toledo. She showed great kindness to Christian captives. Like Elizabeth of Hungary and Elizabeth of Portugal, the Miracle of the roses was attached to her legend. While Casilda supposedly predated both Elizabeths, her hagiography was not written until three centuries after her death, and is likely influenced by the story of one of them.

Life
According to her legend, St. Casilda, a daughter of a Muslim king of Toledo, (Yahya ibn Ismail Al-Mamun), showed great compassion for Christian prisoners by frequently smuggling bread into the prison, hidden in a basket concealed in her clothes, to feed them. Once, she was stopped by her father and his Muslim soldiers, and asked to reveal what she was carrying in her skirt. When she began to show them, the bread turned into a bouquet of roses.

She was raised a Muslim, but when she became ill as a young woman, she refused help from the local Arab doctors and traveled to northern Iberia to partake of the healing waters of the shrine of San Vicente, near Buezo, close to Briviesca. When she was cured, she was baptized at Burgos (where she was later venerated) and lived a life of solitude and penance not far from the miraculous spring. It is said that she lived to be 100 years old.

Images 

Painted between 1638 and 1642, Zurbarán's Santa Casilda used as its model a lady of the Spanish court.  She wears the fashions for courtiers of the time.

Bibliography 
 Concha Espina, Casilda de Toledo (Madrid: Biblioteca nueva, 1940)

See also
Saint Casilda of Toledo, patron saint archive

References

External links 
 Zurbaran: Santa Casilda
  Santa Casilda
St. Casilda of Toledo at the Christian Iconography web site
St. Casilda of Toledo
 SANTA CASILDA DE TOLEDO

1050 deaths
Female saints of medieval Spain
11th-century Christian saints
Converts to Catholicism from Islam
11th-century people from al-Andalus
People from Toledo, Spain
Spanish former Muslims
Spanish Roman Catholic saints
Medieval Spanish saints
Year of birth unknown
11th-century Spanish women